Humpback Mountain is a  mountain peak in the Cascade Range, in King County, Washington.

Climate
Humpback Mountain is located in the marine west coast climate zone of western North America. Most weather fronts originate in the Pacific Ocean, and travel northeast toward the Cascade Mountains. As fronts approach, they are forced upward by the peaks of the Cascade Range, causing them to drop their moisture in the form of rain or snowfall onto the Cascades (Orographic lift). As a result, the west side of the Cascades experiences high precipitation, especially during the winter months in the form of snowfall. During winter months, weather is usually cloudy, but, due to high pressure systems over the Pacific Ocean that intensify during summer months, there is often little or no cloud cover during the summer.

References

External links
 Northwest Ridge of Humpback Mountain
 Humpback Mountain Feb 5, 2006
 Humpback Mountain

Mountains of King County, Washington
Humpback Mountain
Cascade Range